Bells from the Deep: Faith and Superstition in Russia, is a 1993 documentary film written and directed by Werner Herzog, produced by Werner Herzog Filmproduktion.

Summary
Bells from the Deep is German director Werner Herzog's documentary investigation of Russian mysticism. The first half of the film is concerned primarily with Vissarion, a Russian faith healer claiming to be the reincarnation of God as was Jesus. Herzog uses primarily interviews with Russians and scenes from the religious services of the two holy men. Herzog also has several segments on the religion of Siberian nomads.

The second half of the film is primarily concerned with the legend of the lost city of Kitezh. This myth is about a city that was in peril of being destroyed by marauding Mongols, but whose citizens prayed for rescue. Hearing their prayers, God placed the city at the bottom of a deep lake, where it resides to this day. Some even say that one can hear the bells from the city's church. The story is recounted by a local priest and pilgrims visiting the lake.

Towards the end of the film, Vissarion blesses the viewers of the film.

Embellishments
Herzog, as he often does, embellished the story of the Lost City considerably, acknowledging his fabrications fully:
"I wanted to get shots of pilgrims crawling around on the ice trying to catch a glimpse of the lost city, but as there were no pilgrims around I hired two drunks from the next town and put them on the ice.  One of them has his face right on the ice and looks like he is in very deep meditation.  The accountant’s truth: he was completely drunk and fell asleep, and we had to wake him at the end of the take."
Herzog defends the fabrication as reaching a greater truth:
"I think the scene explains the fate and soul of Russia more than anything else."

This is in keeping with Herzog's beliefs about truth in film.

The film also contains shots of pilgrims, which are in fact people ice fishing. The chanting Siberians are only performing religious services in one of their two major scenes. In the other they are simply singing a love song.

References

External links
 

1993 films
Films directed by Werner Herzog
Documentary films about the paranormal
Documentary films about spirituality
German documentary films
1993 documentary films
Films about Orthodoxy
1990s German films
Films about faith healing